Tullavilla is a townland near Tubbercurry in County Sligo, Ireland. It is a quiet rural area, at the foot of the Ox Mountains with a mainly farming community.

Townlands of County Sligo